The International Hockey League (IHL) was a minor professional ice hockey league in the United States and Canada that operated from 1945 to 2001. The IHL served as the National Hockey League's alternate farm system to the American Hockey League (AHL). After 56 years of operation, financial instability led to the league's demise. Six of the surviving seven teams merged into the AHL in 2001.

History

Early years
The IHL was formed on December 5, 1945, in a three-hour meeting at the Norton Palmer Hotel in Windsor, Ontario. In attendance were Jack Adams (coach of the Detroit Red Wings), Fred Huber (Red Wings public relations), Frank Gallagher (later league commissioner), Lloyd Pollock (Windsor hockey pioneer), Gerald McHugh (Windsor lawyer), Len Hebert, Len Loree and Bill Beckman. The league began operations in the 1945–46 IHL season with four teams in Windsor and Detroit, and operated as semi-professional league.

In 1947, a team from Toledo, Ohio, joined the league, and the following year the IHL expanded significantly, with teams in four additional U.S. cities. The expansion did not take hold, and for 1949–50, the league was back down to teams in Detroit and Windsor as well as two nearby Canadian cities, Sarnia, Ontario, and Chatham, Ontario. Windsor dropped out in 1950, and expansion into the U.S. began again, with Toledo rejoining the league and new teams in Grand Rapids, Michigan (1950), Troy, Ohio, (1951), Cincinnati (1952), Fort Wayne, Indiana (1952), and Milwaukee (1952). At the same time, the last Canadian team left the league in 1952, when the Chatham Maroons pulled out. Three new U.S. cities were added in 1953. The league would expand and shrink between five and nine teams through the 1950s, with another major expansion in 1959. In the 1962–63 season, the IHL played an interlocking schedule with the NHL-owned Eastern Professional Hockey League, which itself folded after its 1962–63 season. After 11 seasons as a strictly U.S.-based league, the IHL admitted two Canadian teams in 1963, with the Windsor Bulldogs and the return of the Chatham Maroons. Both teams dropped out after one season, however, and the league would not have a Canadian team again until 1996.

Major market expansion
Bill Beagan served as commissioner of the IHL from 1969 to 1978. The Canadian Press cited him for turning around the league's financial situation and making it a top-tier development system for future NHL talent.

Starting in the late 1960s, the IHL's quality of play significantly improved. By the mid-1970s it was on par with the American Hockey League (AHL), the longtime top feeder league for the National Hockey League. Many IHL teams became the top farm teams of NHL teams. In 1984, the league swallowed up a few surviving members of the Central Hockey League, which had ceased operations.

In 1985, the league adopted the shootout to determine tie games in place of traditional overtime. The NHL would begin using the shootout to avoid tie games in 2005. 

Beginning in the late 1980s and continuing into the mid-90s, the IHL expanded into major markets such as Atlanta, Cincinnati, Cleveland, Denver, Houston, Indianapolis, Kansas City, Las Vegas, Minneapolis–Saint Paul, Orlando, Phoenix, Salt Lake City, San Antonio, San Diego, and San Francisco. Many of these markets were served by the defunct World Hockey Association or were abandoned by the NHL. The IHL also entered markets that already had NHL teams, such as Chicago, Detroit, and Los Angeles. In 1996, the IHL moved its Atlanta and Minneapolis–Saint Paul franchises to Quebec City and Winnipeg, respectively, restoring the league's Canadian presence and filling the void left by the departure of the NHL's Quebec Nordiques and the original Winnipeg Jets.

The minimum requirements to for an IHL expansion team in 1995 were "a 10,000-seat arena, a population base of one million, and a $6 million franchise fee." As the league expanded into larger markets, many of the smaller-market teams (such as Fort Wayne, Peoria, Muskegon, Kalamazoo and Flint) left the IHL and joined lower-level leagues.

Decline and collapse
The IHL's expansion into NHL markets put a strain on relationships between the leagues. There was some speculation that the IHL was intending to compete directly with the NHL, especially when a lockout in 1994–95 threatened to wipe out the NHL season. However, in the 1995–96 season, the IHL's "soft" salary cap was just $1.5 million, while the lowest NHL team payroll that season was $11.4 million. An Fall 1994 article in Sports Illustrated praising the IHL and mocking the NHL only fueled the fire. In said article, IHL officials detailed plans to continue expanding the league to large markets in North America, as well as, "a six-team European league with franchises in England, Switzerland, Italy, Austria, Sweden and France."

In response, many NHL clubs shifted their affiliations to the AHL, and by 1997–98, only four of 18 IHL teams had NHL affiliations. With the loss of subsidized salaries, high expansion fees (by the end the league was charging as much as $8 million US for new teams), exploding travel costs and the NHL itself moving back into some of its markets, the league's rapid expansion proved a critical strain, and it folded after the 2000–01 season.

Six IHL franchises (the Chicago Wolves, Grand Rapids Griffins, Houston Aeros, Utah Grizzlies, Milwaukee Admirals and Manitoba Moose) were admitted into the AHL as expansion teams for the 2001–02 season. Between them, they have played for the AHL Calder Cup seven times, winning four—including three in a row after their arrival. As well, the Cincinnati Cyclones was readmitted to the East Coast Hockey League, which hosted the team from 1990 to 1992 before it moved to the IHL. The Orlando Solar Bears (the final IHL playoff champions) and the Kansas City Blades were not admitted into the AHL because their owner, Rich DeVos, who also owned the Griffins, was allowed to own only one AHL franchise. The league's other two teams, the Cleveland Lumberjacks and Detroit Vipers, ceased operations along with the league.

Two former IHL teams that moved to the AHL have since relocated: the Utah Grizzlies moved to Cleveland, Ohio, to become the Lake Erie Monsters (rebranded as Cleveland Monsters in 2016) in 2007 and the Houston Aeros moved to Des Moines, Iowa, to become the Iowa Wild in 2013. A third team, the Manitoba Moose, temporarily relocated to St. John's, Newfoundland and Labrador to become the St. John's IceCaps from 2011 to 2015. Three former franchises have been relaunched in lower-tier leagues since the IHL's demise. The Utah Grizzlies name was revived by the former Lexington Men O' War of the ECHL when they moved, and the Orlando Solar Bears restarted as an ECHL expansion team. The Peoria Rivermen have had three more franchises with an expansion team in the East Coast Hockey League from 1996 to 2005, a relocated Worcester IceCats  in the American Hockey League from 2005 to 2013, and a fourth incarnation of the Peoria Rivermen subsequently launched in the Southern Professional Hockey League in 2013.

Trophies and awards

Source.

Franchise timelines

See also
List of developmental and minor sports leagues
List of ice hockey leagues
Minor league

References

External links
International Hockey League 1945-2001 Internet Hockey Database - Standings and Statistics
International Hockey League 1945-2001 Internet Hockey Database - IHL Awards

 
Defunct ice hockey leagues in the United States
Defunct ice hockey leagues in Canada